The Ebrach (also: Geiselwinder Ebrach) is a river of Bavaria, Germany.

The Ebrach springs from the confluence of the Ebrachbach and the Haselbach in Geiselwind. It discharges west of Geiselwind from the right into the Reiche Ebrach.

See also
List of rivers of Bavaria

References

Rivers of Bavaria
Rivers of Germany